Blastobasis normalis is a moth in the  family Blastobasidae. It is found in mainland Ecuador and on the Galapagos Islands. A single specimen was recorded in Liverpool in September 1921, but this might be based on a misidentification.

The length of the forewings is 4.2-6.4 mm. The forewings are highly variable, ranging from greyish brown to pale greyish brown or brown. Most scales are tipped with white. Both surfaces of the hindwings are pale greyish brown.

References

Moths described in 1918
Blastobasis